The War of the Jewels (1994) is the 11th volume of Christopher Tolkien's series The History of Middle-earth, analysing the unpublished manuscripts of his father J. R. R. Tolkien. It is the second of two volumes—Morgoth's Ring being the first—to explore the later 1951 Silmarillion drafts (those written after the completion of The Lord of the Rings).

Book

Inscription

There is an inscription in tengwar on the title page of each volume of The History of Middle-earth, written by Christopher Tolkien and describing the contents of the book. The inscription in Volume XI reads "In this book are recorded the last writings of John Ronald Reuel Tolkien concerning the wars of Beleriand, here also is told the story of how Húrin Thali[o]n brought ruin to the Men of Brethil, with much else concerning the Edain and Dwarves and the names of many peoples in the speech of the Elves."

Contents 

The volume includes:

 The second part of the 1951 Silmarillion drafts
 An expanded account of the "Grey Annals", the history of Beleriand after the coming of the Elves.
 Additional narratives involving Húrin and the tragedy of his children (see Narn i Chîn Húrin). "The Wanderings of Húrin" is the conclusion to the Narn. It was not included in the final Silmarillion because Christopher Tolkien feared that the heavy compression which would have been necessary to make it a stylistic match with the rest of the book would have been too difficult and would have made the story overly complex and difficult to read.
 Christopher Tolkien's explanation of how he, with the collaboration of future fantasy author Guy Gavriel Kay, constructed Chapter 22 "Of the Ruin of Doriath" of the Quenta Silmarillion, since none of his father's accounts of this episode were recent enough to fit the narrative in its final form. In particular, the old texts all portray Thingol as a miser who cheats the Dwarves out of their payment, and the portrayal of the Girdle of Melian in the older stories is much weaker than the impenetrable barrier of the post-Lord of the Rings writings.
 Tolkien's exploration of the origins of the Ents and the great Eagles.
 "Quendi and Eldar" discusses the many names the Elves gave to themselves in Primitive Quendian and Common Eldarin and their evolution in Quenya, Telerin, and Sindarin; it has many details about the history of the Elves and their sundering. It also explains the Elvish names given to Men, Dwarves, and Orcs.
 "The Cuivienyarna" is an Elvish folk-tale about the awakening of the Elves.

References

1994 books
Middle-earth books
11
Fantasy books by series